Brock Richard Purdy (born December 27, 1999) is an American football quarterback for the San Francisco 49ers of the National Football League (NFL). He played college football at Iowa State University. He was selected by the 49ers with the final pick in the 2022 NFL Draft, becoming Mr. Irrelevant.

After being named the third-string quarterback to start his rookie season, injuries to quarterbacks Trey Lance and Jimmy Garoppolo forced Purdy into the starting role. He won all five regular season games he started, contributing to the team’s ten-game winning streak that propelled the 49ers to a division title and an NFC Championship Game appearance.

Early years 

Purdy is a native of Queen Creek, Arizona, and played high school football for Perry High School in Gilbert, Arizona. He is the middle child of Shawn and Carrie Purdy. Shawn was a Minor League Baseball player for eight seasons. His older sister, Whittney Purdy, played softball at Southeastern University, and reportedly "would frustrate" Brock as children because she was able to outthrow him. Their younger brother Chubba Purdy later became the starting quarterback at Perry before being recruited to Florida State as a dual-threat quarterback.

High school career 

Purdy started his varsity football career during the 2015 season as a sophomore for the newly opened Perry High School. In 2016, the Arizona Interscholastic Association (AIA) adjusted the athletic regions, placing Perry in the 6A Division Premier Region, ranked as the sixth toughest region in the nation. Purdy's performance elevated Perry into the 6A Division AIA State Championship game in 2016 and 2017, losing 65–28 and 48–42 respectively, both to Chandler High School.

During his tenure, Purdy began to establish himself as a football power in Arizona, competing against Chandler Unified School District's more established powerhouse programs such as Chandler (0–5), Hamilton (4–2), and Basha (2–1). Overall Purdy achieved a 27–13 record at Perry. He was named Gatorade's Football Player of the Year and was The Arizona Republic high school football player of the year.

Purdy was considered a three-star prospect by 247Sports. He signed his letter of intent to commit to Iowa State University on February 7, 2018, enrolling in June of the same year.

College career

2018
Purdy entered his freshman year at Iowa State University in 2018 as the third string to Kyle Kempt and Zeb Noland. He became the starter after Kempt was injured and Noland was ineffective. Overall he started eight games, completing 146 of 220 passes for 2,250 yards, 16 touchdowns, and seven interceptions for what would prove to be a career-best 169.9 passer rating (sixth best in all NCAA football), and compiling a 7–2 record for the Cyclones. He also rushed for 308 yards and five touchdowns.

2019
His sophomore season, Purdy started all 13 games, compiling a 7–6 record. The year was highlighted by 435 yards and a school record 510 total yards, along with three touchdowns against Louisiana-Monroe, five passing and one rushing touchdown in a close 41–42 loss against then No. 9 Oklahoma Sooners (University of Oklahoma), and 372 yards with three passing and one rushing touchdown in a win over Kansas. He passed for a touchdown in 12 consecutive games, a school record, as were his 39 completions against Oklahoma State. He also led the Big-12 in passing yards with 3,982 and was third with both 27 passing and 35 total touchdowns, which shattered George Amundson's 41-year-old school record of 24 total touchdowns.

2020

His junior year, Purdy had less flashy statistics, but the emergence of running back Breece Hall led the Cyclones to a 9–3 record (tied with the 2000 season for the best record in program history) and No. 9 national ranking, their highest in a history stretching back to 1895. He had three touchdowns and no interceptions in a 45–0 shutout of Kansas St, followed two weeks later by completing 20/23 passes for three touchdowns and rushing for 38 yards and another touchdown in 42–6 victory over West Virginia. In the Fiesta Bowl, Purdy passed and rushed for a touchdown in a 34–17 win over Oregon.

2021
In his 2021 senior year, Purdy and Hall again led the Cyclones to a 7–6 winning record, highlighted by 307 yards and two touchdowns in a 24–21 defeat of No. 8 Oklahoma St. He also had 356 yards and three touchdowns against Texas Tech, but lost in a 38–41 shootout. The season was something of a disappointment to a team ranked No. 7 entering the season, but Purdy's 71.7 percent completion percentage and 3,188 yards again led the Big-12.

Purdy ended his time at Iowa State as a three-time All-Big-12 quarterback and holding 32 school records including career pass attempts, completions, percentage, yards, and both passing (81) and total (100) touchdowns. His 14 games with 300-plus passing yards was nearly triple the previous school record of five by Bret Meyer. Purdy's four years at Iowa State corresponded with the first time the school's football program had seen four consecutive winning seasons since 1923–27.

Statistics

Professional career 

The San Francisco 49ers selected Purdy with the final pick (262nd overall) of the 2022 NFL Draft, making him that year's Mr. Irrelevant. The Athletic later obtained the scouting report of another NFL team that evaluated Purdy but opted not to draft him; the report described Purdy as experienced and "works through his progressions very well" but "not a very good athlete...limited arm, both in strength and throw repertoire." After observing Purdy's subsequent performance in his first NFL season, the coach who authored the report told The Athletic that while Purdy's record in college was impressive, "The requirement to juke people and outrun people in college is a lot lower than it is in the NFL... In college, they might be able to outrun that D-end or pull away from that linebacker, but they got hawked down in the NFL. But Purdy has kinda maintained that and almost surpassed his level of agility in the NFL." The coach indicated that Purdy's performance in his first NFL season would likely have warranted being drafted in the second or third round, saying: "We undervalued his agility and probably the mental side, and San Francisco is perfect for it because they put a lot of importance on that because of their offense."

2022 

Trey Lance was named the starter over Jimmy Garoppolo for the 2022 season, making Purdy the third string quarterback, but Lance appeared in only two games before suffering a season-ending ankle injury against the Seattle Seahawks in Week two. On October 23, 2022, Purdy relieved Garoppolo on the 49ers' last drive in the  quarter against the Kansas City Chiefs, throwing for 66 yards and an interception in the 44–23 loss.

On December 4, 2022, in the first quarter of the 49ers' Week 13 matchup against the Miami Dolphins, Garoppolo also suffered a foot injury, causing the 49ers to call upon Purdy once again. Purdy performed efficiently, and finished the game completing 25-of-37 passes for 210 yards, two touchdowns—one to running back Christian McCaffrey and one to fullback Kyle Juszczyk—and one interception in a 33–17 win. Purdy became the first 'Mr. Irrelevant' to throw a touchdown pass in a regular season game. Following Garoppolo's injury, Purdy was named the 49ers' starting quarterback for the remainder of the 2022 season.

On December 11, 2022, Purdy became the only quarterback in his first career start to beat a team led by Tom Brady, when the 49ers defeated the Tampa Bay Buccaneers 35–7. Purdy finished the game with 185 passing yards and two passing touchdowns, along with a 2-yard rushing touchdown. After the game, the 49ers sent out a tweet dubbing Purdy "Mr. Relevant", a reference to Purdy having been drafted as "Mr. Irrelevant" as the last pick taken in the 2022 NFL Draft, followed by his sudden jump to relevance in the 49ers' season.

In the following game against the Seattle Seahawks, Purdy and the 49ers won the matchup and the NFC West division by a score of 21–13. He had 17-for-26 passing with 217 yards and two touchdowns, both to George Kittle, in the win. Purdy became the second player in NFL history, after Aaron Rodgers, to record a cumulative quarterback rating of 115 or greater in his first two starts. Next, during Week 16 against the Washington Commanders, Purdy finished with 234 passing yards, two touchdowns, and an interception as the 49ers won 37–20. In a Week 17 matchup against the Las Vegas Raiders, Purdy led the 49ers to a 37–34 overtime victory. He finished the game with 284 passing yards, two passing touchdowns, and one interception. On January 12, 2023, the NFL named Purdy as the NFC's Rookie of the Month for December and January.

Purdy finished the regular season throwing for 1,374 yards for thirteen touchdowns and four interceptions, winning all five of his starts and leading the 49ers to the second seed in the playoffs. Purdy's passer rating of 119.4 through his five starts is the highest for a quarterback in his first five starts since Kurt Warner in 1999.

In the 49ers' Wild Card game on January 14, 2023, against the Seattle Seahawks, Purdy became the first 49ers rookie quarterback to start and win a playoff game, while putting him 6–0 in career starts. In the game, he completed 18-of-30 passes for 332 yards and scored four total touchdowns, the most by a rookie quarterback in a playoff game. With the 49ers' subsequent victory in the divisional round against the Dallas Cowboys, Purdy became the third quarterback since 1970 to win two playoff games in his rookie season. Although throwing no touchdowns in this game, Purdy completed 19-of-29 passes for 214 yards, which also made him the first rookie quarterback since 1970 to throw over 200 yards in consecutive NFL postseason games.

During the NFC Championship Game against the Philadelphia Eagles on January 29, Purdy suffered an injury to his right elbow. He was replaced by Josh Johnson. Following Johnson's concussion in the third quarter, Purdy reentered the game, though he would only throw two more passes; he was primarily tasked with handing off the ball to his teammates. The 49ers would go on to lose 7–31. Purdy was diagnosed with a complete tear of his ulnar collateral ligament, which rendered him unable to throw the ball more than 10 yards.

NFL career statistics

Regular season

Postseason

Personal life 

Purdy is a Christian. He has said, "Every time I playno matter what happensI want others to see God through my actions. Every time I step on the field I want to bring Him glory. Even when we lose, I point to God and thank Him for the opportunity. Everything happens for a reason; it's all a lesson from the Lord. It's a game, it's not my life."

Purdy grew up a Miami Dolphins fan, and wears number 13 in honor of Dan Marino.

As of his first season in the NFL, Purdy lives with fellow 49ers Nick Zakelj and Alfredo Gutiérrez. Their joint holiday card in 2022 went viral on social media after being displayed in the 49ers' locker room.

Notes

References

External links 

 
 San Francisco 49ers bio
 Iowa State Cyclones bio

1999 births
Living people
American Christians
American football quarterbacks
Iowa State Cyclones football players
People from Gilbert, Arizona
Players of American football from Arizona
San Francisco 49ers players
Sportspeople from the Phoenix metropolitan area